Six ships in service to the United States have been named Revenge. 

  was a schooner built in 1776 and served on Lake Champlain. She was either taken or burned in 1777.
  was a cutter in the Continental Navy. She was purchased in 1777, served until sold in 1779 and continued to harass British shipping as a privateer.
  was a schooner purchased in 1806 and served during the years preceding the War of 1812. She was wrecked in 1811 off the coast of Rhode Island.
  was a schooner built in 1808, as Gunboat No. 158. She was placed in service as Revenge in 1822 and served until 1824.
  was a schooner built in 1812 and purchased in 1813.
  was a World War II-era , commissioned in 1943 and decommissioned in 1965.

United States Navy ship names